The 1969 Chevron Paradise 6 Hour was an endurance race for Sports Cars and Touring Cars.
The event was held at the Surfers Paradise circuit in Queensland, Australia on 2 November 1969.

The race was won by Kunimitsu Takahashi &  Yoshikayo Sunago, driving a Datsun R380 Mk. 2.

Classes
Entries were divided into the following classes:
 Sports Racing over 2000cc
 Sports Racing under 2000cc
 Sports Improved Production under 2000cc
 Touring Improved Production over 2000cc
 Touring Improved Production under 2000cc
 Sports Series Production under 2000cc

Results

Given that there were 30 entries, there may have been more starters than have been accounted for in the above table.

Notes
 Entries: 30 
 Start: Le Mans-style
 Pole Position: Frank Matich, Don O'Sullivan, 1m 13.3s (set by Matich)
 Distance covered by winning car, 257 laps, 514 miles (827 kms)
 Fastest lap: Frank Matich, 1m 13s

References

Further reading
 Jim Shepherd, A History of Australian Motor Sport, 1980, page 147

External links
 Prince, Datsun, make that Nissan R380…, primotipo.com

Motorsport at Surfers Paradise International Raceway
Chevron Paradise 6 Hour
November 1969 sports events in Australia